Larry Flynn (April 10, 1930 – September 14, 2007), of Holly Hill, Florida, USA, was a NASCAR Grand National race car driver that competed in eight races from 1955 to 1961.

Career
Prior to 1955, Flynn would compete exclusively at the Daytona Beach Road Course for the "Modified" and "Sportsman" divisions of NASCAR. He would drive Ford vehicles from the late 1930s during his formative years in professional stock car racing. As a competitor in the 1955 Southern 500, he had the fastest finishing Ford in the race with a fifth-place finish. Flynn's impressive accomplishment gave credibility to the Ford racing teams that were racing in NASCAR during that era. During the 1956 Southern 500, he would crash into fellow NASCAR driver Bill Brown in an incident that would cause the fence to be temporarily broken.

His total career earnings in the NASCAR Grand National Series were considered to be $1,700 ($ when adjusted for inflation) and he finished 1162 laps (1439.6 miles) of racing. Flynn also racked up a single top-five finish in addition to his only top-ten finish. After suffering from complications due to his diabetes, Flynn would die in 2007 at the age of 77. Most of the races in Larry's NASCAR Cup Series career were done as a driver/owner. However, he would race in the 1955 Southern 500 under the employment of Mr. W.R. Waldon.

In 1970, Flynn won the Bobby McKim Memorial Race at the  DeLand Drive-In Raceway, having set the fastest qualifying time for the event. His ultimate retirement from motorsports came from a 68th-place finish at an International Supermodified Association (ISMA) race at Daytona International Speedway on February 1, 1976.

In 1955 Larry finished 2nd at Langhorne which was a major Modified-Sportsman race.

References

1930 births
2007 deaths
Deaths from diabetes
NASCAR drivers
NASCAR team owners
People from Holly Hill, Florida
Racing drivers from Florida